Safir (meaning "traveler") is an Iranian 4x4 multipurpose military vehicle built by Fath Vehicle Industries. The Safir weighs 1.5 tonne and is based on the M38. The jeep can be distinguished from the M38 due to the sharp angled body panels, hood and grille.

It has been supplied to Iraq via militia forces since it is inexpensive and affordable to produce them in mass numbers.

History
The Safir was officially unveiled in 2008. In the ceremony, Iranian defense minister said that 3,000 Safirs were built in that year, and Fath industries would deliver 5,000 more vehicles to defense industry per year. The jeep was seen in public media outside of Iran with its use under pro-Iranian militias fighting against Islamic State.

Sudan makes the Safir under license as the Karaba VTG01, which was publicly shown to visitor at the IDEX 2013 convention in the United Arab Emirates.

Variants
Safir has a modular build and has many models. These include:

A version equipped with 12 Fajr 1 107 mm rocket tubes.
A version equipped with a 106 mm recoilless rifle (M40) for use against enemy armored vehicles
A model equipped with a Toophan anti-tank missile launcher to counter enemy tanks
A model equipped with 9K11 Malyutka anti-tank missiles (Probably Iranian produced Ra'ad)
A model equipped with Towsan anti-tank missiles
A variant equipped with a Grenade launcher
Command vehicle
Ambulance
Radio wave emitter

The Safir can be used to transport of heavy weapons like the Fajr 1 rockets, 106 mm recoilless rifle and Toophan anti tank missile.

Operators

 : Used by the Iranian military.
 : Provided Safirs to PMU paramilitary.
 : Made under license as Karaba VTG01.
 : seen in use with Syrian military forces.
 : Used by the Libyan National Army.

Non-state actors

 Known to be used by Kata'ib Hezbollah, the Badr Army and Peshmerga forces.
 Known to be used by the Islamic State and Hayat Tahrir al-Sham, captured vehicles.
 Harakat Hezbollah al-Nujaba
 Kata'ib Sayyid al-Shuhada
 Asa'ib Ahl al-Haq
 Liwa al-Zulfiqar
  Liwa Fatemiyoun
 Saraya Ansar al-Aqeeda
 Saraya al-Salam
 Saraya Ashura
 Saraya al-Khorasani

Gallery

References

External links
Video

Military equipment of Iran
Military vehicles introduced in the 2000s
Military light utility vehicles